The 2001–02 European Nations Cup was the third edition of the newly reformed European championship. It was the first to be decided over two years.

Since the format had changed at the end of 2001, Georgia were allowed to keep their 2001 title. The championship simply carried on from 2001 with the standings starting as they had finished and playing the reversed fixtures.

Also new to the championship was the introduction of Promotion/relegation between Division 1 and 2A. The Netherlands, after three consecutive bottom-placed finishes, were relegated.

The champions of the first two-year season were Romania, overtaking Georgia's lead from 2001.

Table

Results
For the 2000–01 season, see here.

Week 1

Week 2

Week 3

Week 4

Week 5

External links
2001-02 European Nations Cup First Division at ESPN

2001–02
2001–02 in European rugby union
2001–02 in Spanish rugby union
2002 in Russian rugby union
2002 in Georgian sport
2002 in Dutch sport
2001–02 in Romanian rugby union
2002 in Portuguese sport